Iqbal Z. Quadir is an entrepreneur and promoter of the role of entrepreneurship and innovations in creating prosperity in low-income countries. He has taught at Harvard Kennedy School and at Massachusetts Institute of Technology. He is the brother of Kamal Quadir.

"In 1993, before others imagined the possibility, and only one percent of Americans were using mobile phones, Quadir saw mobiles as productivity tools to lift up the poorest in the world." Between 1993 and 1997, Quadir founded Grameenphone in Bangladesh to provide universal access to telephone service and to increase self-employment opportunities for its rural poor.

In 2007, he founded the Legatum Center for Development and Entrepreneurship at the Massachusetts Institute of Technology (MIT), of which he is now founder and director emeritus. A year earlier, he co-founded, and continues to edit, Innovations, an MIT Press journal.

Early years
Quadir was born in Jessore, Bangladesh. He moved to the United States in 1976 and later became a naturalized U.S. citizen. He passed his Secondary School Certificate from Jhenidah Cadet College, Bangladesh. He received a B.S. with honors from Swarthmore College (1981), an M.A. (1983) and an M.B.A. (1987) from the Wharton School of the University of Pennsylvania.

Career

Quadir served as a consultant to the World Bank in Washington, D.C., (1983–1985), an associate at Coopers & Lybrand (1987–1989), an associate of Security Pacific Merchant Bank (1989–1991), and vice president of Atrium Capital Corporation (1991–1993).

From 1993 on, Quadir changed his focus to his underlying aspiration, to create universal access to digital telephone service in Bangladesh and to increase self-employment opportunities for its rural poor. To that end, he founded the New York-based company Gonofone (Bengali for "phones for the masses"). To further his vision, he went on to organize a global consortium involving Telenor, Norway's leading telecommunications company; an affiliate of micro-credit pioneer Grameen Bank in Bangladesh (winner of the 2006 Nobel Peace Prize); Marubeni Corp. in Japan; Asian Development Bank in the Philippines; Commonwealth Development Corp. in the United Kingdom; and International Finance Corp. and Gonofone in the United States. He attracted these investors by complementing his vision of connecting all of Bangladesh with a practical distribution scheme whereby village entrepreneurs, backed by micro-loans, could retail telephone services to their surrounding communities. In fact, Quadir coined the phrase "connectivity is productivity" to explain the unique impact of Information Communication Technologies (ICTs), particularly mobile telephones, in improving economic efficiency.

The resulting company, Grameenphone, received a license for cell-phone operation in Bangladesh in November 1996; it started operations in March 1997. Currently, the largest telephone company in Bangladesh with about 55 million subscribers, Grameenphone generates revenues close to $2 billion annually. With infrastructure investments of more than $3 billion, the company is providing cellular coverage throughout Bangladesh. Grameenphone's success has been lauded as a model for a novel approach to improving economic opportunity and connectivity and empowering citizens in poor countries through profitable investments in technology. According to Economist Jeffrey Sachs Grameenphone ‘opened the world’s eyes to expanding the use of modern telecommunications technologies in the world’s poorest places.’ 

From 2001 to 2005, Quadir served as a Fellow at Harvard's Kennedy School and taught graduate-level courses of technology in developing countries. At the same time, he was also a Fellow at the Center for Business Innovation at Cap Gemini Ernst & Young (now Capgemini).

In 2005, Quadir moved to MIT. In 2007 he founded the Legatum Center for Development and Entrepreneurship. The center is based on the belief that economic development and good governance in low-income countries emerge from entrepreneurship and forward-looking innovations that empower ordinary citizens. It supports promising entrepreneurs through a fellowship for MIT students who are committed to building and scaling ventures in the developing world.  Quadir no longer leads the Legatum Center.

Quadir coined the phrase invisible leg to describe how technological innovations change economies in terms of the distribution of economic and political influence.

In an effort to apply his development approach to electricity production in Bangladesh, where 70% of the population does not have access to the national electricity grid, Quadir founded Emergence BioEnergy, Inc., in 2006. This and another project (namely, removing arsenic from water) were featured in an article entitled "Power to the people" in the March 9, 2006 issue of The Economist. In 2007, Emergence BioEnergy won a Wall Street Journal Asian Innovation Award. After a decade of working on the development of these projects, however, he became dissatisfied and shut down both of them.

Current projects
Quadir and his brother Kamal cofounded bKash in Bangladesh in 2009. bKash, the country's leading mobile financial service, currently provides mobile banking and payment services to 28 million subscribers.

In 2004, he and his siblings founded the Anwarul Quadir Foundation to promote innovations for Bangladesh. In 2006, the foundation established a $25,000 global essay competition, the Quadir Prize, through the Center for International Development at Harvard University. In October 2007, the foundation made its first award to two recipients.  In April 2009, Stephen Honan was the winner of the second award.  Mr. Honan developed an innovative way to extract arsenic from drinking water and soil.

Recognition
In 1999, Quadir was selected Global Leader for Tomorrow by the World Economic Forum based in Geneva, Switzerland. In 2006, he became the 12th recipient of the Science, Education and Economic Development (SEED) Award from the Rotary Club of Metropolitan Dhaka, for initiating universal telephone coverage to Bangladesh. He appeared on CNN and PBS and was profiled in feature articles in the Harvard Business Review (Bottom-Up Economics, Aug 2003, & Breakthrough Ideas for 2004, Feb 2004), Financial Times, The Economist, and The New York Times, and in several books. In Spring 2007, Wharton Alumni Magazine selected Quadir for its list of 125 Influential People and Ideas. In 2011, he received the honorary degree of Doctor of Humane Letters from Swarthmore College and the honorary degree of Doctor of Science from Case Western Reserve University.

See also 

 List of TED speakers

References

External links
 Iqbal Z. Quadir’s MIT Page
 MIT Legatum Center for Development and Entrepreneurship
  (TEDGlobal 2005)
 Official Quadir Prize: Global Essay Competition Webpage at Harvard University
 Anwarul Quadir Foundation−	
 Official Quadir Prize: Global Essay Competition Webpage at Harvard University
 Differing Visions" Boston Globe, November 18, 2007	
 Canadian Broadcast Corporation Sunday - Bangladesh Calling - March 2008
 “A bottom-up plan to turn Bangladesh's economy upside-down Iqbal Quadir wants to help the rural poor”  Boston Globe, March 24, 2008

1958 births
American Muslims
Bangladeshi emigrants to the United States
Harvard Kennedy School staff
Living people
Bengali Muslims
20th-century Bengalis
21st-century Bengalis
Swarthmore College alumni